These are the official results of the Women's High Jump event at the 1991 IAAF World Championships in Tokyo, Japan. There were a total number of 29 participating athletes, with two qualifying groups and the final held on Saturday August 31, 1991.

Schedule
All times are Japan Standard Time (UTC+9)

Results

Qualifying round
Held on Thursday 1991-08-29

Final

See also
 National champions high jump (women)
 1990 Women's European Championships High Jump (Split)
 1992 Women's Olympic High Jump (Barcelona)
 1993 Women's World Championships High Jump (Stuttgart)

References

External links 
 Results

H
High jump at the World Athletics Championships
1991 in women's athletics